Arturo García (born 23 October 1946) is a former Mexican cyclist. He competed in the men's sprint at the 1968 Summer Olympics.

References

1946 births
Living people
Mexican male cyclists
Olympic cyclists of Mexico
Cyclists at the 1968 Summer Olympics
Sportspeople from Mexico City